Kanakachilanga is a 1966 Malayalam language film. It is an adaptation of the Bollywood movie Kismet, starring Ashok Kumar and Mumtaz Shanti. It is the first Malayalam film that included an additional scene after the release.

Cast
 Prem Nazir
 Sheela
 Muthayya
 Adoor Bhasi
 Manavalan Joseph
 T. K. Balachandran
 Thikkurissy Sukumaran Nair
 Pankajavalli
 Pathmini
 Sukumari

References

1966 films
1960s Malayalam-language films
Films directed by M. Krishnan Nair